David Andrews (born January 1, 1952) is an American character actor who is known for his role as Lieutenant General Robert Brewster in Terminator 3: Rise of the Machines.

Early life 
Andrews was born on November 2, 1952 in Baton Rouge, Louisiana. He attended Louisiana State University as an undergraduate and spent a year at the Duke University School of Law and two at Stanford Law School, from which he graduated in the late 1970s.

Career 
His first major role was in the 1984 horror A Nightmare on Elm Street. For the rest of the 80s Andrews did not have any major hits, mainly focusing on a TV career including the BBC detective series Pulaski in 1987. He was the lead in Cherry 2000, which appeared on videocassette and not in theaters. In 1990 he starred in Stephen King's Graveyard Shift and in 1994 he was James Earp in Kevin Costner's Wyatt Earp. His career was boosted by starring in the TV series Mann & Machine. In 1995 he played astronaut Pete Conrad, in the space drama Apollo 13. In the late 90s Andrews concentrated on more television projects and starred in TV films such as Our Son, the Matchmaker, Fifteen and Pregnant, which also starred Kirsten Dunst, and the hit TV film Switched at Birth. In 1998 he played another astronaut, Frank Borman, in the HBO miniseries From the Earth to the Moon. In the 2001 Band of Brothers miniseries, he had a brief role as Major General Elbridge Chapman, the division commander in 1945, of the 13th Airborne Division.

Andrews appeared in Fight Club. In 2000, Andrews starred in Navigating the Heart before moving on to the Silence of the Lambs sequel Hannibal, starring Anthony Hopkins. He also appeared in A Walk to Remember (2002), Two Soldiers (2003), The Chester Story and Terminator 3: Rise of the Machines. He also replaced John M. Jackson in the final season of JAG, playing Judge Advocate General Major General Gordon 'Biff' Cresswell. He was Edwin Jensen in the TV Movie The Jensen Project, and guest starred in the Criminal Minds season 4 episode "Paradise".

Andrews played the role of Scooter Libby in the 2010 film, Fair Game, based on the Valerie Plame affair.

Filmography

References

External links

American male film actors
American male television actors
Male actors from Baton Rouge, Louisiana
1952 births
Living people
Stanford Law School alumni
Louisiana State University alumni